The 2013 Dally M Awards were presented on Tuesday 1 October 2013 at Sydney's Star Casino and broadcast on Fox Sports. They were the official annual awards of the 2013 NRL season.

Judges
The 13 judges for the 2013 Dally M's were:

Fox Sports:  Greg Alexander, Gary Belcher and Ben Ikin

Channel 9:  Brad Fittler, Andrew Johns and Wally Lewis

Sky NZ:  Daryl Halligan

The Daily Telegraph:  Paul Crawley, Paul Kent, Josh Massoud, Dean Ritchie, Barry Toohey, Nick Walshaw and Justin Newlan

Dally M Medal

Dally M Awards
The Dally M Awards were, as usual, conducted at the close of the regular season and hence do not take games played in the finals series into account. The Dally M Medal is for the official player of the year while the Provan-Summons Medal is for the fans' of "people's choice" player of the year.

Team of the Year

See also
Dally M Awards
Dally M Medal
2013 NRL season

References

2013 sports awards
2013 NRL season
2013